Wu Feng (born 12 June 1951) is a Chinese engineer who is a professor at Beijing Institute of Technology, and an academician of the Chinese Academy of Engineering.

Biography
Wu was born in Beijing, on 12 June 1951. During the Down to the Countryside Movement, he was a sent-down youth in Shanxi. He received his bachelor's degree and master's degree from Taiyuan University of Technology in 1978 and 1981, respectively.

He taught at Beijing Institute of Technology since 1982, what he was promoted to associate professor in 1986 and to full professor in 1991. In May 2014, he was awarded an honorary doctor of science from the University of Massachusetts Boston.

Honours and awards
 2005 State Science and Technology Progress Award (Second Class)
 2012 Science and Technology Progress Award of the Ho Leung Ho Lee Foundation
 2013 State Technological Invention Award (Second Class)
 2014 Member of the International Eurasian Academy of Sciences
 27 November 2017 Member of the Chinese Academy of Engineering (CAE)

References

1951 births
Living people
Engineers from Beijing
Taiyuan University of Technology alumni
Academic staff of Beijing Institute of Technology
Members of the Chinese Academy of Engineering